Malpas-Trenton is an outback locality in the Shire of Mckinlay, Queensland, Australia.

Geography
The Flinders River forms most of the southern boundary before flowing through to the west.

References 

Shire of Mckinlay
Localities in Queensland